Mary O. Furner is an American historian.

Life
She graduated from Northwestern University, with a Ph.D., in 1972. Her monograph, Advocacy and Objectivity: A Crisis in the Professionalization of American Social Science, 1865-1905 (University of Kentucky Press), won the Frederick Jackson Turner Award in 1973.
She is Professor of History at University of California, Santa Barbara.

Awards
 1973 Frederick Jackson Turner Award
 2007 Fulbright Distinguished Chair in American Studies, Goethe University Frankfurt
 1988-89 National Endowment for the Humanities Fellow
 1982 Woodrow Wilson International Center for Scholars Fellow

Works

Inquiring Minds Want to Know: Social Investigation In History And Theory. Modern Intellectual History / Volume 6 / Issue 01 / April 2009, pp 147 - 170 DOI: 10.1017/S14“Defining the Public Good in the U.S. Gilded Age, 1883-1898: ‘Freedom of Contract’ versus ‘Internal Police’ in the Tortured History of Employment Law and Policy,”  Journal of the Gilded Age and Progressive Era 17:2 (April 2018):1-35 79244308001972, Published online: 05 March 2009
“Ideas, Interdependencies, Governance Structures,and National Political Cultures: Norbert Elias’s Work as a Window on U.S. History,”  Civilizing and Decivilizing Processes: Figurational Approaches to American Culture, eds. Christa Buschendorf, Astrid Franke, Johannes Voelz (Cambridge Scholars Press, 2011)
“Defining the Public Good in the U.S. Gilded Age, 1883-1898: ‘Freedom of Contract’ versus ‘Internal Police’ in the Tortured History of Employment Law and Policy,”  Journal of the Gilded Age and Progressive Era 17:2 (April 2018):1-35

References

21st-century American historians
Northwestern University alumni
University of California, Santa Barbara faculty
Living people
Year of birth missing (living people)
American women historians
21st-century American women writers